Dangerous Magical Noise is an album by the American rock music group The Dirtbombs.

Track listing 
 "Start the Party" – 1:41
 "Get It While You Can" – 2:25
 "Don't Break My Heart" – 1:43
 "Sun is Shining" – 2:37
 "Earthquake Heart" – 2:23
 "Thunder in the Sky" - 3:38
 "Motor City Baby"  – 3:02
 "Stuck in thee Garage" – 2:00
 "I'm Through With White Girls " (Diamond) – 3:02
 "21st Century Fox" – 3:30
 "Stop" – 3:46
 "Stupid" - 2:19
 "F.I.D.O." – 4:27

The first 1,000 copies of the CD contain two bonus songs: covers of Brian Eno's "King's Lead Hat" and Robyn Hitchcock's "Executioner of Love".

The first 1,000 copies of the vinyl LPs come with a bonus 7" with two covers of songs by the Cheater Slicks: "Refried Dream" and "Possession".

Personnel 

 Ben Blackwell Drums
 Patrick Pantano Drums
Mick Collins guitar
 Tom Potter Fuzz Bass
Jim  Diamond  bass

References

External links 
 [ Strange Magical Noise] at Allmusic

2003 albums
The Dirtbombs albums
In the Red Records albums